Nayra River is a river in western India in Gujarat whose origin is near Mothada. Its basin has a maximum length of 32 km. The total catchment area of the basin is 279 km2.

References 

Rivers of Gujarat
Rivers of India